"Rock or Bust" is the second single and first track from the album of the same name by Australian hard rock band AC/DC. It was written by Angus Young and Malcolm Young. It was released for downloads on 17 November 2014, as a follow-up for the band's first officially released single from the album titled "Play Ball".

AC/DC drummer Phil Rudd was absent from the video shoot for the single, and was replaced by Welshman Bob Richards, who had previously played with Man, Adrian Smith, Asia and Shogun.

The song was shortlisted for Song of the Year at the APRA Music Awards of 2015.

Charts

References

2014 songs
AC/DC songs
Song recordings produced by Brendan O'Brien (record producer)
Songs written by Angus Young
Songs written by Malcolm Young
2014 singles